is a city in Chiba Prefecture, Japan. , the city had an estimated population of 131,852 in 63,098 households and a population density of 620 persons per km². It is the site of Narita International Airport, one of the two main international airports serving the Greater Tokyo Area.

Geography
Narita International Airport is about  further from the city center of Narita (the location of the city hall). Located on the Shimosa Plateau, the old town (centered on Narita-san) and the new town are in the southwestern part of the city, and Narita International Airport is in the hills in the southeast. Agricultural areas take water from the Tone River, which runs through the border between Imba-numa in the western part of the city and Ibaraki prefecture on the north.

Surrounding municipalities
Chiba Prefecture
Sakae
Inzai
Shisui
Tomisato
Shibayama
Tako
Katori
Kōzaki
Ibaraki Prefecture
Kawachi

Climate
Narita has a humid subtropical climate (Köppen Cfa) characterized by warm summers and cool winters with light to no snowfall.

Demographics
Per Japanese census data, the population of Narita has recently plateaued after several decades of growth.

History
The area Narita has been inhabited since the Japanese Paleolithic period. Archaeologists have found stone tools dating to some 30,000 years ago on the site of Narita Airport. Numerous shell middens from the Jōmon period, and hundreds of burial tumuli from the Kofun period have been found in numerous locations around Narita. Place names in the vicinity of Narita appear in the Nara period Man'yōshū (although the name “Narita” does not appear in written records until 1408). As Narita is located roughly equidistant from the Pacific Ocean and Tokyo Bay, around a number of small rivers, it was a natural political and commercial center for the region, and gained importance as a pilgrimage destination with the foundation of the noted Buddhist temple of Shinsho-ji in 940 AD. During the Heian period, the area was a center for the revolt of Taira Masakado. During the Edo period, the area continued to prosper as part of the tenryō within Shimōsa Province under direct control of the Tokugawa shogunate.

After the Meiji Restoration, the area was organized as a town under Inba District on April 1, 1889. Portions of the town were destroyed by Allied air raids in February and May, 1945. On  March 31, 1954, Narita gained city status through merger with the neighboring villages of Habu, Nakago, Kuzumi, Toyosumi, Toyama, and Kozu. Growth in the area began in earnest in 1966, when Prime Minister Eisaku Satō laid out the plan for Narita International Airport. The development of the airport and accompanying access to central Tokyo led to widespread residential, commercial and industrial development in the city. However, construction of the airport was widely opposed, and violent demonstrations occurred through the end of the 1960s and early 1970s, which delayed the opening of the airport until May 20, 1978.

On March 27, 2006, the towns of Shimofusa and Taiei (both from Katori District) were merged into Narita.

Government
Narita has a mayor-council form of government with a directly elected mayor and a unicameral city council of 30 members. Narita contributes two members to the Chiba Prefectural Assembly. In terms of national politics, the city is part of the Chiba 10th district of the lower house of the Diet of Japan.

Areas

Central Narita
Central Narita is roughly defined as the area between Narita Station, Keisei Narita Station and the Narita-san Temple.

Narita New Town
Narita New Town is a planned residential area to the west of Narita Station. It has 16,000 homes with a total population of 60,000. The area was designed in 1968 based on the new towns surrounding London in the UK, and now houses most of the city's population. Many residents of the area are airport or airline workers: the area houses corporate housing and dormitories for Japan Airlines, All Nippon Airways, the Japan Civil Aviation Bureau and Japan Customs. There are also several Urban Renaissance Agency and other government-subsidized housing projects in the area.

Kōzunomori
Kōzunomori is a suburban area of Narita located south of the New Town, about 4 minutes by train from Keisei Narita Station. It has a population of about 12,000. Kōzunomori Station is flanked by a large Your Elm department store.

Airport and farm areas
Narita International Airport is located on the east side of Narita in a historically agricultural area called . The construction and later expansion of the airport led to intense civil unrest among Sanrizuka residents (see Narita International Airport's history). Although land expropriation and poorer farming conditions due to the airport's construction have caused Narita's farming population to drop two-thirds from pre-airport levels, the area immediately surrounding the airport remains lightly populated by farmers.

Industrial areas
Both zones were laid out in the 1960s to take advantage of Narita Airport and the ability to quickly import and export goods by air. An aircraft part repair plant operated by JAL (Japan Airlines) and Pratt & Whitney, called Japan Turbine Technologies, is located in the Taiei industrial estate.

Economy
Although Narita's economy was historically focused on agriculture, the opening of Narita International Airport refocused the local economy on transportation, logistics and tourism. Most of the airport property is located within Narita City, but many airport hotels and airport-related logistics facilities are in the neighboring towns of Shibayama and Tomisato.

Prologis, FedEx Express, Sagawa Express and several other large logistics firms have major shipping centers in the city.

Nippon Cargo Airlines and Vanilla Air are headquartered on airport property within the city. Spring Airlines Japan is headquartered in the Kozunomori area of the city.

JALways was headquartered in the JAL Operations Center at the airport before merging into JAL in 2010.

Education

Schools

Narita has 24 public and one private elementary schools, one public combined elementary/junior high school, and nine public and one private junior high school. The public schools are under the control of the Narita City Board of Education. The city has four public high schools operated by the Chiba Prefectural Board of Education.

 
 
 
 Narita Kokusai High School

Private schools:
  (成田高等学校・付属中学校)

Public libraries
The City of Narita operates the Narita Public Library. In addition each community center includes a library branch.

Transportation

Airport

Narita International Airport provides domestic and international services.

Railway
JR East Narita Express trains and Keisei Skyliner trains connect Narita Airport to central Tokyo.

 JR East – Narita Line
––
 JR East – Narita Line (Abiko branch line)
–
 JR East – Narita Line (Airport branch line)
––

  Keisei Electric Railway: Keisei Main Line
–––
 Keisei Electric Railway: Keisei Higashi-Narita Line
 –
 Keisei Electric Railway: Keisei Narita Airport Line
 ––

Highway
The Higashi-Kantō Expressway connects Narita to Tokyo and Chiba City. Chiba Kotsu and Narita Kuko Kotsu provide bus service through the city. The Narita City Loop Bus, operated by both companies, operates on two circular routes around the city, stopping in major commercial areas and at all major hotels.

Twin towns – sister cities

Narita is twinned with:
 Foxton, New Zealand (1995)
 San Bruno, United States (1990)

Friendship cities
 Jeongeup, North Jeolla, South Korea (2002)
 Jung District, Incheon, South Korea (1998)
 Næstved, Denmark (2003)
 Xianyang, Shaanxi, China (1988)

Local attractions

 Narita-san Shinsho-ji Temple
 Shiseki Park
 Chiba Prefectural Boso Fudoki-no-oka Museum
 Narita Wholesale Market
 Narita Peace Pagoda

Notable people

Yuji Funayama, professional footballer
Yusuke Igawa, professional footballer
Yoshio Inaba, actor
Manabu Iwadate, professional baseball player
Yuki Karakawa, professional baseball player
Takeharu Kunimoto, musician
Yōko Oginome, singer
Sakura Sōgorō, Edo period folk hero

See also
Komikado Shrine

References

External links

Official Website 
 

 
Cities in Chiba Prefecture